
Gmina Miedźna is a rural gmina (administrative district) in Pszczyna County, Silesian Voivodeship, in southern Poland.

Villages
Gmina Miedźna contains the villages and settlements of Frydek, Gilowice, Góra, Grzawa, Miedźna and Wola.

Neighbouring gminas
Gmina Miedźna is bordered by the gminas of Bestwina, Bojszowy, Brzeszcze, Oświęcim, Pszczyna and Wilamowice.

Twin towns – sister cities

Gmina Miedźna is twinned with:
 Hustopeče, Czech Republic
 Nová Dubnica, Slovakia
 Zbarazh, Ukraine

References

Miedzna
Pszczyna County